Bakaj (Бакай) is an Eastern European surname (sometimes transliterated to Bakay or Bakai)(see also Bakay). Notable people with the surname include:

 Elis Bakaj, Albanian footballer
 Edvan Bakaj, Albanian footballer
 Maria Grigoriievna Yatsenyuk (née Bakaj), former Ukrainian Prime Minister Arseniy Yatsenyuk's mother
 Andrew P. Bakaj, U.S. Attorney and lead counsel for the Whisteblower during the Impeachment Inquiry and the subsequent first Impeachment of President Donald Trump.